Intercalation may refer to:

Intercalation (chemistry), insertion of a molecule (or ion) into layered solids such as graphite
Intercalation (timekeeping),  insertion of a leap day, week or month into some calendar years to make the calendar follow the seasons
Intercalation (university administration), period when a student is officially given time off from studying for an academic degree
Intercalation (geology), a special form of interbedding, where two distinct depositional environments in close spatial proximity migrate back and forth across the border zone
Intercalary chapter, a chapter in a novel that does not further the plot. See also frame story (sometimes called intercalation).
 In biology:
Intercalary segment, an appendage-less segment in the segmental composition of the heads of insects and Myriapoda
Intercalation (biochemistry), process discovered by Leonard Lerman by which certain drugs and mutagens insert themselves between base pairs of DNA
Intercalated cells of the amygdala
Intercalated cells of the collecting duct
Intercalated disc of cardiac muscle
Intercalated duct of exocrine glands